Yan Shixin (1918 – 1993) was a Chinese footballer. He competed in the men's tournament at the 1948 Summer Olympics.

References

External links
 

1918 births
1993 deaths
Chinese footballers
China international footballers
Olympic footballers of China
Footballers at the 1948 Summer Olympics
Place of birth missing
Association football defenders